Garcinia pyrifera is a species of flowering plant in the family Clusiaceae. It is found in Malaysia and Singapore.

References

Least concern plants
pyrifera
Taxonomy articles created by Polbot